Merostomichnites is an ichnofossil genus, interpreted as a eurypterid trace. Traces produced by this large eurypterid were described from the Silurian and Lower Ordovician, and has been found in Portugal and Norway. The eurypterid trail was found by Hanken and Dr. J. Miller in 1971. The tracks in Norway were likely made by Mixopterus kiaeri.

See also
 List of eurypterid genera

References

Eurypterida
Fossil trackways